Swinyard Hill is a hill in the Malvern Range, a line of hills that runs approximately  north-south along the Herefordshire-Worcestershire border. Swinyard Hill lies north of Midsummer Hill and south of Hangmans Hill.

References

Hills of Worcestershire
Malvern Hills